Labores del Hogar is a monthly women's magazine published in Barcelona, Spain. Founded in 1926 it is among the oldest publications in the country.

History and profile
Labores del Hogar was started in 1926. In 1990 Edipresse SA acquired 75% of the publisher of the magazine, El Hogar y la Moda S.A. In 1993 Edipresse SA became the sole owner of the magazine. It is published by RBA Holding Editorial S.A on a monthly basis in Barcelona. It offers articles about housework, needlework and the related techniques.

The magazine has a Portuguese edition and a Romanian edition.

See also
 List of magazines in Spain

References

External links
 

1926 establishments in Spain
Magazines established in 1926
Magazines published in Barcelona
Monthly magazines published in Spain
Spanish-language magazines
Women's magazines published in Spain